Inishmore Island may refer to:
 Inishmore, the largest of the Aran Islands in Galway Bay, Ireland
 Inishmore (or Deer) Island, in County Clare, Ireland
 Isle of Inishmore, list of ships